Prosoplus giloloensis is a species of beetle in the family Cerambycidae. It was described by Stephan von Breuning in 1943.

Subspecies
 Prosoplus giloloensis rotundipennis Breuning, 1943
 Prosoplus giloloensis giloloensis Breuning, 1943

References

Prosoplus
Beetles described in 1943